Simon Senft (born 11 June 1982) is a German fencer. He competed in the team foil event at the 2004 Summer Olympics.

References

External links
 

1982 births
Living people
German male fencers
Olympic fencers of Germany
Fencers at the 2004 Summer Olympics
Sportspeople from Cologne